Bastin is a French-language surname, more common in Belgium than in France. Notable people with the surname include:

Bineesh Bastin, Indian actor
Bruce Bastin (born 1939), English folklorist
Cliff Bastin (1912–1991), English footballer
Désiré Bastin (1900–1971), Belgian footballer
George Bastin (1893–1947), Australian rules footballer
Jules Bastin (1933–1996), Belgian opera singer
Jules Bastin (soldier) (1889–1944), Belgian military officer
Jules Bastin (sport shooter) (1879–?), Belgian sport shooter
Julia Bastin (1888–1968), Belgian academic, educator and writer
Marjolein Bastin (born 1943), Dutch artist, writer and illustrator
Ted Bastin (1926–2011), English physicist and mathematician

French-language surnames